The R600 is a Regional Route in South Africa.

Route
Its north-eastern terminus is the N11 just east of the N11's divergence from the N3. It heads southwest, crossing the N3 to Winterton, where it intersects the R74 at a staggered junction. From Winterton, it continues south-west ending at the Champagne Castle hotel at an entrance to uKhahlamba / Drakensberg Park.

References

Regional Routes in KwaZulu-Natal